The 415th Chemical Brigade is a chemical unit in the United States Army Reserve, located in Greenville, South Carolina.

Subordinate units 

As of 2017 the following units are subordinated to the 415th Chemical Brigade:

 415th Chemical Brigade, in Greenville, South Carolina
 92nd Chemical Battalion, in Decatur, Georgia
 457th Chemical Battalion, in Greenville, South Carolina
 479th Chemical Battalion, in Queens, New York
 485th Chemical Battalion, in Wilmington, Delaware
 20th Support Command Detachment, Aberdeen Proving Ground, Maryland

Mission
To provide command and control of two to six chemical battalions and other assigned or attached separate companies at Corps level. To provide staff planning and coordination for the combat, combat support, and combat service support operations for all assigned and attached units. To allocate units and resources in support of chemical, biological, radiological, and nuclear (CBRN) reconnaissance, decontamination, biological detection, and smoke operations. And, to conduct civilian decontamination in response to a domestic accident or deliberate CBRN incident.

Motto
CHEMISM is the motto of the 415th Chemical Brigade. This motto means chemical force or action. This dedicates the unit to the tradition of being prepared to use whatever force or action necessary for the national defense.

References

External List
 415th Chemical Brigade

Chemical brigades of the United States Army
Military units and formations of the United States Army Reserve